President of the Congress of the Republic of Peru is the presiding officer in the Congress of the Republic of Peru. 
This is a list of representatives that have served as Presidents of the Peruvian legislature. The Constitution of 1993 re-arranged Congress into a unicameral legislature. The President is elected for a one-year term.

Constituent Congress (1822–1825)

Constituent Congress (1827–1828)

Congress (1829–1832) 
First bicameral congress of Peru.

Constituent Congress (1833–1834)

Legislative Assembly of Peru–Bolivian Confederation

Constituent Congress (1839–1840)

Bicameral Congress (1845–1853)

Presidents of the Senate (1845–1853)

Presidents of the Chamber of Deputies (1845–1853)

National convention (1855–1857)

Congress (1858–1859)

President of the Senate (1858–1859)

Constituent Congress (1860)

Bicameral Congress (1860–1865)

Presidents of the Senate (1860–1865)

Constituent Congress (1867)

Bicameral Congress (1868–1879)

Presidents of the Senate (1868–1879)

Congress (1881) 
Installed by the government of Francisco García Calderón in Chorrillos.

President of the Senate (1881)

National constituent assembly (1881) 
Installed by Nicolás de Piérola in Ayacucho.

Constituent assembly in the North (1882–1883)

Installed by the government of Miguel Iglesias in Cajamarca.

Congress (1883) 

Installed by the government of Lizardo Montero Flores in Arequipa.

President of the Senate (1883)

Constituent Congress (1884–1885)

Congress (1886)

President of Senate (1886)

Bicameral Congress (1886–1919)

Presidents of Senate (1886–1919)

National constituent assembly (1919)

Bicameral Congress (1919–1930)

Presidents of the Senate (1919–1930)

Government of Peru
Lists of political office-holders in Peru
Peru
President
President
President